Ben Davis (born 19 May 1997) is a former professional Australian rules footballer who played for the Adelaide Football Club in the Australian Football League (AFL). He was drafted by the Adelaide with their final selection and 75th overall in the 2016 national draft. A member of the Sydney Swans's academy as a junior, he was ineligible to be selected by the Swans under the bidding system as he did not nominate for the AFL draft before he was 18.

Davis' brother, Abe Davis, was drafted by Sydney in 2014 and his father Graham Davis played basketball for the Sydney Kings. His father's family is part of the Kusu clan, originally from Thursday Island in the Torres Strait Islands.

In 2018 Davis was Adelaide's leading SANFL goalscorer. He was delisted in October 2022 after playing 11 AFL games.

References

External links

1997 births
Living people
Adelaide Football Club players
Australian rules footballers from New South Wales
Indigenous Australian players of Australian rules football